The M89 is a short metropolitan route in Greater Johannesburg, South Africa. It consists of only one street (Elgin Road) in the city of Kempton Park.

Route 
The M89 begins at a junction with the M86 Road (De Wiekus Rd) in the Van Riebeeck Park suburb, just south of the M86's junction with the R25 Road. It goes eastwards as Elgin Road, meeting the M84 Road (Mooiriver Drive; Soutpansberg Drive) and entering the Birchleigh suburb, to reach its end at a roundabout junction with the M57 Road (Pretoria Road).

References 

Streets and roads of Johannesburg
Metropolitan routes in Johannesburg